Kʰunamokwst Park is a public park in Portland, Oregon's Cully neighborhood, in the United States. The  park was acquired in 2009. According to the City of Portland, the park is the first operated by Portland Parks & Recreation "to enjoy a name indigenous to the land it sits on".

References

External links

 

2009 establishments in Oregon
Cully, Portland, Oregon
Parks in Portland, Oregon